Sesarma is a genus of terrestrial crabs endemic to the Americas.

Many species within this genus live in mangroves. They have evolved to be fully terrestrial, which means they do not have to return to the sea even to spawn. Several species initially placed here are now placed in other genera of the Sesarmidae, and in some cases even elsewhere in the Grapsoidea.

Sesarma contains the following extant species:

Sesarma abeokuta Schubart & Santl, 2014 
Sesarma aequatoriale Ortmann, 1894
Sesarma ayatum Reimer & Diesel, 1998
Sesarma bidentatum Benedict, 1892
Sesarma cookei Hartnoll, 1971
Sesarma crassipes Cano, 1889
Sesarma curacaoense De Man, 1892
Sesarma dolphinum Schubart & Diesel, 1998
Sesarma fossarum Reimer, Diesel & Türkay, 1997
Sesarma jarvisi Rathbun, 1913
Sesarma meridies Schubart & Koller, 2005
Sesarma rectum Randall, 1840
Sesarma reticulatum (Say, 1817)
Sesarma rhizophorae Rathbun, 1906
Sesarma rubinofforum Abele, 1973
Sesarma sulcatum Smith, 1870
Sesarma verleyi Rathbun, 1914
Sesarma windsor Türkay & Diesel, 1994

Sesarma nr. reticulatum, undescribed species related to Sesarma reticulatum

References

Grapsoidea
Terrestrial crustaceans